The Korea Combat Training Center (abbreviated KCTC; , Hanja: 陸軍科學化戰鬪訓鍊團) is a South Korean military training unit for the ROK Army and Marine Corps. It is one of the subordinate elements of the Republic of Korea Army Training & Doctrine Command.

Combat training

The multiple integrated laser engagement system (MILES) has been used for simulated combat exercises at the Korea Combat Training Center. The KCTC largely adopted the systems of the National Training Center (NTC) and the Joint Readiness Training Center (JRTC) in the beginning, but later developed its own battlefield simulation system.

The KCTC Opposing Force (OPFOR) representing the Korean People's Army Ground Force serves as the North Korean counterpart for the trainees. It employs North Korean military doctrine and simulates North Korean equipment to replicate the strength and tactics of the North Korean Army infantry force. Along with the expansion of the training center, the OPFOR has become a regiment-sized unit since 2015.

By establishing simulation systems for the Army aviation and the Air Force, the KCTC plans to start regiment-level training that includes AirLand Battle drills in 2016.

Training participants
Infantry divisions of Ground Operations Command
Republic of Korea Marine Corps
Republic of Korea Army Special Forces
Korea Military Academy
Korea Army Officer Candidate School
Korea Army Academy at Yeongcheon
Reserve Officers' Training Corps

References

External links
 Korea Combat Training Center (Korean)

Training establishments of the South Korean Army
Military units and formations established in 2002
Inje County